Çanakkale Airport  is an airport in the city of Çanakkale, Turkey.

History
Total passenger traffic was 18,423 in 2009. The busiest days at the airport are 18 March and 25 April every year, both significant dates in Turkish history related to the Ottoman Empire's involvement in the Gallipoli Campaign of World War I; 18 March is the anniversary of World War I defeat of the allied attempt to force the Dardanelles; and 25 April is Anzac Day.

Facilities
The airport has one runway, oriented in the 04-22 direction and with dimensions of 2350x45m.

Airlines and destinations

Statistics

References

Airports in Turkey
Buildings and structures in Çanakkale Province
Transport in Çanakkale Province